Crystal Crag is a 10,377-foot-elevation (3,163 meter) summit located in the Sierra Nevada mountain range in Mono County of northern California, United States. This photogenic landmark, popular with rock climbers, is situated approximately three miles south of the community of Mammoth Lakes, on land managed by Inyo National Forest. Crystal Lake lies below the west aspect and T J Lake below the east aspect. Precipitation runoff from the peak drains into these three lakes, thence north to Mammoth Creek. This mountain's toponym has been officially adopted by the United States Board on Geographic Names.

Climbing
The first ascent of Crystal Crag is unknown but was likely before 1900.

The Northeast Face was climbed by Owen Williams on August 11, 1936. The North Buttress was climbed by Alvin McLane, John Houghton, and Reggie Donatelli on March 3, 1968. Galen Rowell and Vern Clevenger climbed the East Face in January 1973.

Climate
Crystal Crag is located in an alpine climate zone. Most weather fronts originate in the Pacific Ocean, and travel east toward the Sierra Nevada mountains. As fronts approach, they are forced upward by the peaks (orographic lift), causing them to drop their moisture in the form of rain or snowfall onto the range.

Gallery

See also
 List of mountain peaks of California
 Herlihy Peak

Further reading
 Crystal Crag Climbs, Donette Swain, Todd Swain (2003), Alpine Diversions Publishing

References

External links
 Weather forecast: Crystal Crag
 Crystal Crag rock climbing: Mountainproject.com

Inyo National Forest
Mountains of Mono County, California
North American 3000 m summits
Mountains of Northern California
Sierra Nevada (United States)